Henry St John Stirling Woollcombe (27 December 1869 – 1 December 1941) was the inaugural Bishop of Whitby from 1923 until 1939; and also of Selby. Born into a clerical family, he was educated at Clifton College and Keble College, Oxford before being ordained in 1895. After a curacy in Stepney  he became head of the Oxford House University Settlement in nearby Bethnal Green. A brief spell as chaplain to Cosmo Gordon Lang (Archbishop of York) was followed by a decade as the parish priest of Armley. Promotion to be the Sub Dean of Diocese of Coventry in 1922 was swiftly followed by elevation to the episcopate. After 16 years at Whitby he made a sideways move to become Bishop of Selby- a post he held only for 18 months. His Times obituary noted his capacity for "getting on with and getting the best out of all conditions of men.

References

1869 births
People educated at Clifton College
Alumni of Keble College, Oxford
Bishops of Whitby
Bishops of Selby
20th-century Church of England bishops
1941 deaths